Linda Correll Roesner (born in 1940) is an American musicologist from New York. Roesner has distinguished herself with the publication of critical scores of Schumann and Brahms works. In 1998, Roesner received the Robert Schumann Prize of the City of Zwickau.

References

External links 
 Symphony no. 4, D minor, op. 120 on WorldCat
 

1940 births
Living people
People from New York City
American women musicologists
American musicologists
21st-century American women